Events in the year 1902 in Bulgaria.

Incumbents

Events 

 17 February – The Progressive Liberal Party, which won 89 of the 189 seats in the parliament following parliamentary elections. Voter turnout was 49.8%.

References 

 
1900s in Bulgaria
Years of the 20th century in Bulgaria
Bulgaria
Bulgaria